Martyn James Lewis (born 12 August 1982) is a Welsh badminton player specialist in doubles. He represented Wales at the 2002, 2006, and 2010 Commonwealth Games. In the national event, he plays for the Caerphilly, and has won eleven times the National Championships title from 2003-2016.

Achievements

BWF International Challenge/Series 
Men's singles

Men's doubles

 BWF International Challenge tournament
 BWF International Series tournament

References

External links
 European results
 

Welsh male badminton players
1982 births
Living people
Sportspeople from Caerphilly
Commonwealth Games competitors for Wales
Badminton players at the 2010 Commonwealth Games
Badminton players at the 2006 Commonwealth Games
Badminton players at the 2002 Commonwealth Games